I Could Live in Hope is the debut studio album by American indie rock band Low. It was released on December 2, 1994, on Vernon Yard Recordings.

Background and composition
A reaction to the abrasiveness of alternative rock in the early 1990s, when grunge had reigning popularity, Low "eschewed conventional songwriting in favour of mood and movement." Influenced by Brian Eno and Joy Division, the band, working with long-time producer and New York underground mainstay Mark Kramer, favored slow-paced compositions, a minimum of instrumentation and an economy of language.

Reception

I Could Live in Hope received generally positive reviews from contemporary music critics. Writing for the Chicago Tribune, Greg Kot felt that "its heavy-lidded drama creeps by in all-enveloping slow motion" and called it "the best record made for those dreary, nothing's-going-on-and-I-want-to-crawl-into-a-hole afternoons since Galaxie 500's debut."

Legacy
Featuring an "unprecedent pace in the then-flowering underground," I Could Live in Hope helped to birth the genre known as slowcore, which encompassed acts from Bedhead to Codeine throughout the 1990s.

Pitchfork placed I Could Live in Hope at number 49 on its 1999 list of the best albums of the 1990s. The same year, critic Ned Raggett ranked it at number 37 on his list of "The Top 136 or So Albums of the Nineties" for Freaky Trigger. In 2004, the album was included in Les Inrockuptibles "50 Years of Rock'n'Roll" list. In 2018, Pitchfork placed it at number 22 on its list of the 30 best dream pop albums.

Track listing

Personnel
Credits adapted from the liner notes of I Could Live in Hope.
Low
Alan Sparhawk – guitar, vocals
Mimi Parker – percussion, vocals
John Nichols – bass

Additional personnel
Mark Kramer – production
Steve Watson – assistant production
Low – artwork
Gerree Small – inner sleeve photography

References

Low (band) albums
1994 debut albums
Albums produced by Kramer (musician)